The left gastroepiploic artery (or left gastro-omental artery), the largest branch of the splenic artery, runs from left to right about a finger's breadth or more from the greater curvature of the stomach, between the layers of the greater omentum, and anastomoses with the right gastroepiploic (a branch of the right gastro-duodenal artery originating from the hepatic branch of the coeliac trunk).

In its course it distributes:
 "Gastric branches":  several ascending branches to both surfaces of the stomach; 
 "Omental branches": descend to supply the greater omentum and anastomose with branches of the middle colic.

Additional images

References

External links
  - "Stomach, Spleen and Liver: The Right and Left Gastroepiploic Artery"
  - "The Splenic Artery"
 
 

Arteries of the abdomen
Stomach